General elections were held in Malta on 17 and 18 September 1976. The Malta Labour Party remained the largest party, winning 34 of the 65 seats.

Electoral system
The elections were held using the single transferable vote system. The number of seats was increased from 55 to 65, whilst the voting age was lowered from 21 to 18.

Results

Elected Candidates

District 1
MLP
Borg, John J. - casual election
Brincat, Joseph
Mintoff, Dom - vacated

PN
Bonnici, Emmanuel
Borg Olivier, Giorgio - vacated
Farrugia, Herman - casual election

District 2
MLP
Brincat, Joseph - vacated
Mintoff, Dom
Piscopo, Daniel
Saliba, Joseph - casual election
Sant, Lorry

PN
Mifsud Bonnici, Ugo

District 3
MLP
Abela, Wistin
Attard Bezina, Emmanuel
Barbara, Agatha

PN
Cachia Zammit, Alexander
Muscat, Joseph (Josie)

District 4
MLP
Dalli, John
Grima, Joseph - casual election
Moran, Vincent
Sant, Lorry

PN
Borg Olivier De Puget, Albert
Farrugia, Jimmy

District 5
MLP
Calleja, Reno (Żaren)
Casar, Joseph
Vella, Karmenu

PN
Caruana, Carmelo
Galea, Louis

District 6
MLP
Abela, Ġuze (Joseph)
Brincat, Carmelo
Muscat, Philip

PN
Camilleri, Gius, Maria
Hyzler, George

District 7
MLP
Buttigieg, Anton
Buttigieg, John
Camilleri, Benny - casual election
Cremona, Danny - vacated

PN
De Marco, Guido
Mifsud Bonnici, Antoine

District 8
MLP
Bonaci, Evelyn
Debono Grech, Joe

PN
Fenech Adami, Eddie
Fenech, Joe
Gauci Borda, Lino (Carmel)

District 9
MLP
Holland, Patrick
Naudi, Robert

PN
Bonello Du Puis, George - casual election
Farrugia, Jimmy
Felice, Mario - vacated
Rizzo Naudi, John
Tabone, Censu

District 10
MLP
Baldacchino, Joseph M.
Holland, Patrick - vacated
Privitera, Salvu - casual election

PN
Falzon, Michael - casual election
Felice, Mario
Refalo, Michael
Tabone, Censu - vacated

District 11
MLP
Micallef, Alfred (Freddie) - vacated
Micallef, Daniel
Xuereb, Paul - casual election

PN
Abela, Sammy (Salvatore)
Borg Olivier, Giorgio
Muscat, John

District 12
MLP
Chetcuti Caruana, Paul
Micallef, Alfred (Freddie)

PN
Borg Olivier, Paulu - casual election
Fenech Adami, Eddie - vacated
Gatt, Lawrence
Spiteri, Carm. Lino

District 13
MLP
Buttigieg, Carmelo
Camilleri, Angelo

PN
Attard, Coronato
Cauchi Amabile
Tabone, Anton

References

General elections in Malta
General
Malta
Malta